Leroy Holmes (December 12, 1912 – October 7, 1985), nicknamed "Philly" and "Buddy", was an American Negro league shortstop between 1937 and 1945.

A native of Brunswick, Georgia, Holmes was the brother of fellow Negro leaguer Lefty Holmes and attended Bethune-Cookman College. He made his Negro leagues debut in 1937 for the Jacksonville Red Caps, and played for Jacksonville again the following season. Holmes split 1939 with the Cleveland Bears and Indianapolis ABCs, then played for the New York Black Yankees and Cincinnati Clowns in 1945. He died in Atlanta, Georgia in 1985 at age 72.

References

External links
 and Baseball-Reference Black Baseball stats and Seamheads

1912 births
1985 deaths
Jacksonville Red Caps players
New York Black Yankees players
20th-century African-American sportspeople
Baseball infielders